Aburaso is a town near Kumasi and located in the Kwadaso Municipality in the Ashanti Region of Ghana. The current Assembly member of Aburaso is Emmanuel Nyanteng.

Health 

 Aburaso Methodist Hospital

References 

Communities in Ghana
Ashanti Region